The Revolutionary Piano of Nicky Hopkins is a studio album made by the English musician and session pianist Nicky Hopkins and produced by Shel Talmy. It was released in 1966 by CBS Records. It was described as an "orchestrated, easy-listening collection of standards" by Ultimate Classic Rock. The album contains multiple remastered versions of songs, such as Yesterday by The Beatles. The album was later released as a CD on March 6, 1995, by Sony Music.

Track listing

References

External links 
 AMG review

1966 albums
CBS Records albums
Albums produced by Shel Talmy